Kukharenko is a Ukrainian language surname derived from the occupation kukhar, cook.

It may refer to:

Alexander Kukharenko, a Russian mineralogist, the namesake of kukharenkoite
Sergei Kukharenko is a Russian political and public activist, the leader of Amur Oblast regional department of the Right Cause right-wing liberal political party, member of the federal presidium of "People's Anticorruption Movement".
Yakiv Kukharenko, ataman of the Kuban Cossack Host

Ukrainian-language surnames